Pierre Six (18 January 1888 – 7 July 1916) was a French footballer. He competed in the men's tournament at the 1908 Summer Olympics. He was killed in action during World War I.

See also
 List of Olympians killed in World War I

References

External links
 

1888 births
1916 deaths
French footballers
Olympic footballers of France
Footballers at the 1908 Summer Olympics
Footballers from Le Havre
Association football midfielders
France B international footballers
French military personnel killed in World War I